Regius Professor of Hebrew may refer to:
Regius Professor of Hebrew (Cambridge), a professorship in the University of Cambridge
Regius Professor of Hebrew (Oxford), a professorship at the University of Oxford